Sarput-e Fartaq (also Romanized as Sarpūt-e Fārtaq) is a village in Bahmayi-ye Sarhadi-ye Sharqi Rural District, Dishmok District, Kohgiluyeh County, Kohgiluyeh and Boyer-Ahmad Province, Iran. At the 2006 census, its population was 36, in 6 families.

References 

Populated places in Kohgiluyeh County